Already Free is the sixth studio album by The Derek Trucks Band. It was released in the United States on January 13, 2009 by Legacy Recordings. A European release followed on February 20, 2009. The album has received very positive reviews, and debuted at #19 on the Billboard Top 200 reached #1 on the blues chart, #1 on the Internet chart, and #4 on the Rock chart. This marks the band's highest debut on the Billboard Top 200 chart to date.  The album won the 2010 Grammy Award for Best Contemporary Blues Album, marking the band's first Grammy award.

The first single, "Down in the Flood", was released on November 4, 2008. Guest musicians include Doyle Bramhall II, Oteil Burbridge, Susan Tedeschi, and Eric Krasno (of Soulive). The song "Back Where I Started" was co-written by Trucks with fellow Allman Brothers Band guitarist Warren Haynes.

Trucks' thoughts on the album 

Derek Trucks was interviewed by The Washington Post upon the release of Already Free. The interviewer commented that in comparison to past albums by The Derek Trucks Band, this record reflects a more mature sound. Trucks himself responded by commenting that the album  has a different feeling because in the past he always felt pressure to make a "guitar album". The difference, he maintains, is that the band has had more time to mature, and the album's sound is more balanced between the different contributions of its members, who developed its overall effect as they arranged the songs that were recorded for this album.

Track listing 
 "Down in the Flood" (Bob Dylan) – 5:02
 "Something to Make You Happy" (Paul Pena) – 5:01
 "Maybe This Time" (featuring Doyle Bramhall II) (Derek Trucks, Doyle Bramhall II) – 5:03
 "Sweet Inspiration" (Spooner Oldham, Dan Penn) – 4:38
 "Don't Miss Me" (Trucks, Mike Mattison) – 4:16
 "Get What You Deserve" (Trucks, Mike Mattison, Doyle Bramhall II) – 3:33
 "Our Love" (featuring Doyle Bramhall II) (Doyle Bramhall II, Trucks) – 5:18
 "Down Don't Bother Me" (Mike Mattison, Trucks) – 5:07
 "Days Is Almost Gone" (Kofi Burbridge, Trucks, Mike Mattison) – 5:13
 "Back Where I Started" (featuring Susan Tedeschi) (Trucks, Warren Haynes) – 4:20
 "I Know" (Smith, Taylor) – 4:40
 "Already Free" (Trucks, Mike Mattison) – 2:46

Bonus tracks 
Best Buy has an exclusive edition with three bonus tracks:
 "Ballad of the Chicken Robber" (Trucks/Mattison) - 1:55
 "Swamp Raga" (Trucks) - 6:31
 "Long Time Man" (trad.) - 5:24

iTunes includes a bonus track with the purchase of the album:
 "Goin' Home" (Trucks/Mattison) - 3:14

References

External links 
  The Derek Trucks Band

2009 albums
Derek Trucks albums
Columbia Records albums
Grammy Award for Best Contemporary Blues Album